Caio Gobbo Secco (born 20 December 1990) is a Brazilian professional footballer who plays for Portuguese club Penafiel, as a goalkeeper. He also holds an Italian passport.

Club career
Born in Cambé, Paraná, Secco graduated from local Coritiba's youth setup, and after a trial at VVV-Venlo, he joined CRB.

On 25 June 2012, Secco moved to Vitória. On 21 July, he made his professional debut, replacing injured Gustavo in a 1–0 home success against Atlético-PR.

On 6 December, Secco signed a new six-month deal with Vitória, and was subsequently loaned to Botafogo-BA. After the loan, his link expired and he joined Serie A club Parma in a four-year deal, being subsequently sold to Crotone in co-ownership deal.

On 14 January 2015, he was signed by San Marino Calcio in temporary deal.

On 2 September 2020, Caio Secco signed with Marítimo.

On 29 June 2021, he moved to Penafiel.

References

External links

Caio Secco at playmakerstats.com (English version of ogol.com.br)

1990 births
Living people
Brazilian footballers
Brazilian people of Italian descent
Association football goalkeepers
Clube de Regatas Brasil players
Esporte Clube Vitória players
Parma Calcio 1913 players
F.C. Crotone players
A.S.D. Victor San Marino players
C.D. Feirense players
C.S. Marítimo players
F.C. Penafiel players
Campeonato Brasileiro Série B players
Serie B players
Serie C players
Primeira Liga players
Liga Portugal 2 players
Brazilian expatriate footballers
Brazilian expatriate sportspeople in Italy
Brazilian expatriate sportspeople in Portugal
Expatriate footballers in Italy
Expatriate footballers in Portugal